Yumnam Radheshyam is an Indian politician from Manipur. He was elected to the Manipur Legislative Assembly from Hiyanglam in the 2017 Manipur Legislative Assembly election as a member of the Bhartiya Janata Party.

References 

Living people
Manipur MLAs 2017–2022
Bharatiya Janata Party politicians from Manipur
1960 births